The Adventures of Conan: A Sword and Sorcery Spectacular was an attraction at American theme park Universal Studios Hollywood that ran from 1983 to 1993. It was an 18-minute live-action stage show, similar to the theme park's other "action spectaculars," that took place in a 2,200-seat indoor theater and was loosely based on the film Conan the Barbarian. The show was designed by Gary Goddard, and cost $4 million dollars to build.

It debuted on June 18, 1983, replacing the "Castle Dracula Live Show", and ran for 10 years until it was replaced in 1993 by Beetlejuice's Rock and Roll Graveyard Revue.

Premise
The stage is decorated to resemble a ruined temple filled with treasure. Conan, a skinny young Cimmerian, descends down a rope onto the stage, hoping to plunder the temple's treasures. Conan is mesmerized by the Dragon's Eye, which beckons him to remove it from its holding place, until he is interrupted by the eccentric old wizard Kallias. Kallias explains that the Dragon's Eye contains the evil wizard Taras-Mordor, who was sealed away with the combined powers of Kallias and the Sword of Crom.

Red Sonja is also mesmerized by the Dragon's Eye. Before Conan and Kallias can stop her, she removes the Eye from its altar, freeing Taras-Mordor. Kallias and Mordor duel, and Mordor disintegrates Kallias. Sonja yells at Conan to grab a sword to defend himself, and the youth grabs the Sword of Crom, transforming him into a musclebound barbarian. Mordor summons three powerful warriors, whom Conan and Sonja manage to defeat. Taras Mordor transforms into a 20-foot-tall fire-breathing dragon to ascend from the pit, and after a brief fight Conan defeats the dragon with a stab from the Sword of Crom. The Dragon's Eye is placed back upon its altar, sealing the evil wizard away once more and bringing Kallias back to life.

References

External links
A "behind the scenes" video about the performance
Fan reconstruction the show using behind-the-scenes footage as well as numerous angles from fan recordings
A review of the performance's soundtrack, with information about the soundtrack's creation and aspects of the performance
Adventures of Conan page at theStudioTour.com, website about the history of Universal Studios Hollywood

Works based on Conan the Barbarian
Amusement rides introduced in 1983
Amusement rides that closed in 1993
Universal Studios Hollywood
Universal Parks & Resorts attractions by name
Licensed properties at Universal Parks & Resorts
Amusement park attractions based on film franchises
Former Universal Studios Hollywood attractions
1983 establishments in California
1993 disestablishments in California